Louis K.C. Chan is an American economist currently the Hoeft Professor of Business at University of Illinois.

References

See also
 American Economic Association

Year of birth missing (living people)
Living people
University of Illinois faculty
American economists
University of Rochester alumni
University of Hawaiʻi alumni